General Asım Gündüz is a proposed underground station on the Üçyol–Çamlıkule Line of the İzmir Metro. It will be located beneath Halide Edip Adıvar Boulevard, next to Mahmut Yaşar Bostancı Park, in southern Konak. Construction of the station, along with the metro line, is expected to begin in 2020. West of the station, the line will split and loop around to Üçyol. The northern part of the loop will stop at Zafertepe, while the southern part will stop at Bozyaka. The two section will meet at Üçyol.

General Asım Gündüz station is expected to open in 2024.

References

İzmir Metro
Konak District
Railway stations scheduled to open in 2024
Rapid transit stations under construction in Turkey